Mound Station (Timewell) is a village in Brown County, Illinois, United States. The population was 117 at the 2020 census.

Geography

Mound Station is located at the intersection of U.S. Route 24 and County Route 2.

History 
Mound Station was established as a post office in 1860; the Village of Mound Station incorporated December 23, 1901. In 1903, the post office name changed to Timewell, to avoid confusion with the town of Mounds, Illinois. The Timewell name has supplanted the original name of Mound Station in local use, but the legal village name has never changed. Thus legal references in U.S. Census Bureau products as well as lists from the Illinois Secretary of State's Office continue to show Mound Station, while the local Post Office continues as Timewell.

Demographics

As of the 2020 census there were 117 people, 54 households, and 46 families residing in the village. The racial makeup of the village was 94.02% White, 0.85% Asian, and 5.13% from two or more races. Hispanic or Latino of any race were 1.71% of the population.

There were 54 households, out of which 107.41% had children under the age of 18 living with them, 70.37% were married couples living together, 3.70% had a female householder with no husband present, and 14.81% were non-families. 12.96% of all households were made up of individuals, and 9.26% had someone living alone who was 65 years of age or older. The average household size was 2.76 and the average family size was 2.61.

The village's age distribution consisted of 41.1% under the age of 18, 20.6% from 18 to 24, 12.7% from 25 to 44, 19.1% from 45 to 64, and 6.4% who were 65 years of age or older. The median age was 23.8 years. For every 100 females, there were 98.6 males. For every 100 females age 18 and over, there were 144.1 males.

The median income for a household in the village was $70,625, and the median income for a family was $73,750. Males had a median income of $45,313 versus $34,063 for females. The per capita income for the village was $24,252. About 13.0% of families and 10.6% of the population were below the poverty line, including 15.5% of those under age 18 and none of those age 65 or over.

References

Villages in Illinois
Villages in Brown County, Illinois
Populated places established in 1860
1860 establishments in Illinois